Kirkcaldy Burghs by-election may refer to one several parliamentary by-elections held in Scotland for the House of Commons constituency of Kirkcaldy Burghs:

 1841 Kirkcaldy Burghs by-election
 1862 Kirkcaldy Burghs by-election
 1875 Kirkcaldy Burghs by-election
 1892 Kirkcaldy Burghs by-election
 1921 Kirkcaldy Burghs by-election
 1944 Kirkcaldy Burghs by-election

See also 
 Kirkcaldy Burghs (UK Parliament constituency)